Moyen-Congo may refer to:
 A former French colony in Africa, known as :
 French Congo (Congo français, 1882-1903)
 Moyen-Congo or Middle Congo (1903-1960), as part of French Equatorial Africa between 1910 and 1958
 The independent Republic of the Congo since 1960
 Moyen-Congo Province (1962-1966), a former province of the Democratic Republic of the Congo, part of the larger Équateur province